Uranium hexachloride (UCl6) is an inorganic chemical compound of uranium in the +6 oxidation state. UCl6 is a metal halide composed of uranium and chlorine. It is a multi-luminescent dark green crystalline solid with a vapor pressure between 1-3 mmHg at 373.15 K. UCl6 is stable in a vacuum, dry air, nitrogen and helium at room temperature. It is soluble in carbon tetrachloride (CCl4). Compared to the other uranium halides, little is known about UCl6.

Structure and Bonding

Uranium hexachloride has an octahedral geometry, with point group Oh. Its lattice (dimensions: 10.95 ± 0.02 Å x 6.03 ± 0.01 Å) is hexagonal in shape with three molecules per cell; the average theoretical U-Cl bond is 2.472 Å long (the experimental U-Cl length found by X-ray diffraction is 2.42 Å), and the distance between two adjacent chlorine atoms is 3.65 Å.

Chemical properties
Uranium hexachloride is a highly hygroscopic compound and decomposes readily when exposed to ordinary atmospheric conditions. therefore it should be handled in either a vacuum apparatus or in a dry box.

Thermal decomposition 
UCl6 is stable up to temperatures between 120 °C and 150 °C. The decomposition of UCl6 results in a solid phase transition from one crystal form of UCl6 to another more stable form. However, the decomposition of gaseous UCl6 produces UCl5. The activation energy for this reaction is about 40 kcal per mole.

2 UCl6 (g) → 2 UCl5 (s) + Cl2 (g)

Solubility 
UCl6 is not a very soluble compound. It dissolves in CCl4 to give a brown solution. It is slightly soluble in isobutyl bromide and in fluorocarbon (C7F16).

Reaction with hydrogen fluoride 
When UCl6 is reacted with purified anhydrous liquid hydrogen fluoride (HF) at room temperature produces UF5.

2 UCl6+ 10 HF → 2 UF5 + 10 HCl + Cl2

Synthesis

Uranium hexachloride can be synthesized from the reaction of uranium trioxide (UO3) with a mixture of liquid CCl4 and hot chlorine (Cl2). The yield can be increased if the reaction carried out in the presence of UCl5. The UO3 is converted to UCl5, which in turn reacts with the excess Cl2 to form UCl6. It requires a substantial amount of heat for the reaction to take place; the temperature range is from 65 °C to 170 °C depending on the amount of reactant (ideal temperature 100 °C - 125 °C). The reaction is carried out in a closed gas-tight vessel (for example a glovebox) that can withstand the pressure that builds up.

Step 1: 2 UO3 + 5 Cl2 → 2 UCl5 + 3 O2

Step 2: 2 UCl5 + Cl2 → 2 UCl6

Overall reaction: 2 UO3 + 6 Cl2 → 2 UCl6 + 3 O2

This metal hexahalide can also be synthesized by blowing Cl2 gas over sublimed UCl4 at 350 °C.

Step 1: 2 UCl4 + Cl2 → 2 UCl5

Step 2: 2 UCl5 + Cl2 → 2 UCl6

Overall Reaction: UCl4 + Cl2 → UCl6

References

Uranium(VI) compounds
Chlorides
Actinide halides